New Albany High School may refer to:

New Albany High School (Indiana) in New Albany, Indiana
New Albany High School (Ohio) in New Albany, Ohio
New Albany High School (Mississippi) in New Albany, Mississippi